El Rosario is a municipality in the Morazán department of El Salvador. The municipality has an area of 19.12 km² and a population of 1,296 according to the 2007 census.

Municipalities of the Morazán Department